

A
Heartley Anderson

B
Pete Bahan,
Scotty Bierce,
Arda Bowser

C
Frank Civiletto

E
Hal Ebersole,
Deke Edler,
Cap Edwards

G
Frank Garden,
Charlie Guy

J
Ed Johns

K
Stan Keck,
Johnny Kyle

M
Bo McMillin,
Truck Myers

P
Lou Partlow,

R
Doug Roby,
Rudy Rosatti

S
Joe Setron,
Gaylord Stinchcomb,

T
John Tanner,
Tom Whela

V
Ralph Vince

W
Sol Weinberg,
Dick Wolf,
Joe Work

References
Pro Football Reference Cleveland Indians (NFL 1923) Roster

Cleveland Bulldogs
 
Cleveland Indians (NFL 1923)
Indians (NFL 1923) players